SAAF may refer to:

Military
Saudi Arabian Air Force
Saudi Arabian Armed Forces
Small Arms Ammunition Factory, munitions factories run by the Australian Government
South African Air Force
South Arabian Air Force
Syrian Arab Air Force

Other uses
SAAF (railway), a Romanian company
Saaf (surname), list of people with the surname
Slovak Association of American Football